Maheswari is an Indian former actress, who appeared predominantly  in Telugu and Tamil language films. She was one of the leading actresses in Telugu and Tamil films from 1994 to 2000. She appeared alongside major South Indian stars like Jagapati Babu, J. D. Chakravarthy, Ravi Teja, Ajith Kumar, Vikram, Prabhu, Arjun Sarja, Prabhu Deva, and Shiva Rajkumar. She is best known for her performances in Pelli (1997), Gulabi (1995), Karuththamma (1994), and Ullaasam (1997).

Early life
Maheswari was born into a Telugu speaking family to Mohan Reddy and Suryakala. She has a brother Avishek Karthik who is also an actor. Late veteran actress Sridevi was her maternal aunt.

Personal life
Maheshwari married an engineer named Jayakrishna in 2008. Their marriage was an arranged one. Her husband is a Telugu man originally from Guntur, and is based in Hyderabad. He is the owner and the managing director of a payment software company in Hyderabad.

Career
Maheswari started her film career at the age of 17 in year 1994 through the Tamil film, Karuththamma directed by Bharathiraja and the movie was successful at box office and the song 'Thenmerku Paruva Kaatru' made her famous among Tamil audience. She became popular in Telugu with her second Telugu film named Gulabi in 1995. She played the lead role of Pooja opposite with actor J. D. Chakravarthy. After that she got many offers in movies. Maheswari's first Kannada film was the 1995, Annavra Makkalu. She did her first horror film, Deyyam in 1996 under the production and direction of Ram Gopal Varma. She acted as Mahi, the sister of Sindhu who bought a new estranged house near the graveyard. In this film, she was partnered again with actor, J. D. Chakravarthy and also in 1996 Telugu crime film, Mrugam. In 1997, she starred in Kodi Ramakrishna film, Pelli (film) along with Vadde Naveen. She also did the Telugu films, Priyaragalu, Jabilamma Pelli and Nesam. She was also in the lead role in the multi-award-winning film, Nee Kosam in 1999. Her role as the wealthy Sasirekha gave Maheswari the Nandi Award for Best Actress. She also got her fame in the Tamil film, Ullasam in 1997. Maheswari did few more Tamil and Telugu films including the Maa Balaji, a remake of the Malayalam comedy film, Punjabi House. Maheswari made an elegant performance and succeeded as a heroine for almost 10 years in Telugu and Tamil industry.

After appearing in Tirumala Tirupati Venkatesa, she quit the film industry at the peak of her career in 2000. She married Jayakrishna a software engineer at Tirupati in 2008.

She has since appeared in television for serials after her marriage. In 2010, Maheswari appeared in the serial, Soundaravalli. Then, she featured in the comedy serial, My Name is Manga Tayaru (Telugu) and My Name Is Mangamma (Tamil) in 2012 on Zee TV which was a super hit among households. She has also featured in the serial Adhey Kangal in 2014 which aired on Jaya TV.

She is currently pursuing an alternate career as a fashion designer and recently opened a store and  launched her new label ‘Mahe Ayyapan’ in Hyderabad inaugurated by her aunt Sridevi.

Filmography

Television
2022 Sridevi Drama Company judge - ETV

Awards
Nandi Award for Best Actress - Nee Kosam (1999)

References

External links 
 

Indian film actresses
Actresses in Tamil cinema
Living people
Actresses in Telugu cinema
Actresses in Hindi cinema
Nandi Award winners
20th-century Indian actresses
21st-century Indian actresses
Indian television actresses
Actresses in Tamil television
Actresses in Telugu television
1970 births